The following lists events that happened during 1962 in Singapore.

Incumbents
 Yang di-Pertuan Negara – Yusof Ishak
 Prime Minister – Lee Kuan Yew

Events

April
10 April – The SEACOM cable is announced.

September
1 September – A referendum is held in Singapore to vote on merger with Malaysia. In the end, 70 percent of votes chose merger in accordance with the terms of the 1961 White Paper.

December
 16 December - Trolleybus services in Singapore cease operations.

Births
 6 February – Eleanor Wong – Lawyer, playwright.
 28 March – Alvin Yeo – Former politician.
 29 May – Fandi Ahmad – Former football player.
 14 June – S. Iswaran – Minister of Transport.
 27 October – Ang Peng Siong – Former swimmer.
 Olivia Lum – Hyflux CEO.
 Jennifer Tham Sow Ying – Conductor of Singapore Youth Choir.
 K. F. Seetoh – Food personality, creator of Makansutra.
 Madeleine Lee – Investment manager, poet.

Deaths
21 August – Ahmad Ibrahim, Member of Parliament (b. 1927).

References

 
Singapore
Years of the 20th century in Singapore
Singapore
1960s in Singapore